Barbhag College is an undergraduate college established in the year 1964 at Kalag of Nalbari district in Assam. The college is affiliated to Gauhati University.

Departments

Arts
 Assamese
 English
 Education
 Economics
 History
 Political Science
 Philosophy
 Assamese Second Language

Science
 Botany
 Chemistry General and major course
 Mathematics general and major course
 Physics
 Zoology

Accreditation
In 2005 the college has been awarded 'B+' grade by National Assessment and Accreditation Council. The college is also recognised by University Grants Commission (India).

References

External links

Colleges affiliated to Gauhati University
Universities and colleges in Assam
1964 establishments in Assam
Educational institutions established in 1964
Education in Nalbari district